Smardzew may refer to the following places:
Smardzew, Łęczyca County in Łódź Voivodeship (central Poland)
Smardzew, Sieradz County in Łódź Voivodeship (central Poland)
Smardzew, Zgierz County in Łódź Voivodeship (central Poland)
Smardzew, Masovian Voivodeship (east-central Poland)